Live at the 1963 Monterey Jazz Festival is a live album by Miles Davis released on July 31, 2007, and recorded in September 20, 1963. Davis searched for new musicians for his quintet, after splitting with saxophonist John Coltrane in 1960. The new quintet consists of saxophonist George Coleman, pianist Herbie Hancock, bassist Ron Carter and drummer Tony Williams. It was recorded at the Monterey Jazz Festival in the early fall of 1963.

Track listing
Monterey Jazz Festival Records – MJFR-30310:

Personnel

Musicians
Miles Davis – trumpet
George Coleman – tenor saxophone
Herbie Hancock – piano
Ron Carter – bass
Tony Williams – drums

Production
Greg Allen –	art director, designer
Shawn Anderson – project assistant
Rikka Arnold – editor
Ray Avery – photograph
Glen Barros – producer
Chris Clough – production assistant
Larissa Collins – art director, designer
Ben Conrad – project assistant
Simone Giuliani – A&R assistant, digital editor
Wally Heider – engineer
Mary Hogan – project assistant
Tim "T-Bone" Jackson – producer
Stuart Kremsky – project assistant
Jesse Nichols – project assistant
Jason Olaine – A&R, digital editor
Randy Rood – project assistant
Joe Tarantino – mastering

Charting history

Album

References

External links
 

Miles Davis live albums
2007 live albums
Albums recorded at the Monterey Jazz Festival